Meir Park (Gan Meir) is a park dating back to the early 1940s in the center of Tel Aviv, Israel. It is named after the first mayor of Tel Aviv, Meir Dizengoff and is home to the Tel Aviv Municipal LGBT Community Center.

References 

Parks in Tel Aviv
Urban public parks